Antoniadi Dorsum is a ridge on Mercury at , and it is approximately 359 km in length. In 1976, it was named by the International Astronomical Union after Eugène Michel Antoniadi.

Antoniadi Dorsum cuts across the crater Geddes.  The same trend of ridges continues to the north, where it is called Endeavour Rupes near the crater Holbein, and beyond that it is called Victoria Rupes, which cuts across the crater Enheduanna.

References

Ridges
Surface features of Mercury